Lazarus Kaimbi (born 12 August 1988) is a Namibian professional footballer who plays as a striker for Liga 1 side Madura United.

Club career
Kaimbi joined South African club Jomo Cosmos from Ramblers F.C. of Namibia in November 2006.

On November 9, he scored the 3 goals in the 2014 Thai FA Cup final against Chonburi, to help Bangkok Glass to win their first ever Thai FA Cup trophy. This was considered a huge upset considering that Chonburi had just missed out on the League title and Bangkok Glass came into the match with the statistically worst defense in Thailand's top division.

In June 2018, Kaimbi signed with Malaysia Super League team Kelantan, and made his debut on 5 June in a league match against Kedah.He leaves Kelantan FC in the end of season of 2020.

International career

As a member of the Namibia national football team, Kaimbi competed with the team at the 2008 Africa Cup of Nations.  He scored twice in Namibia's win over Djibouti in the first round of African qualification for the 2014 FIFA World Cup in November 2011.

International goals
Scores and results list Namibia's goal tally first.

Honours
Bangkok Glass
Thai FA Cup 
Winner(1) : 2014

Runner-up (1): 2013

References

5. https://m.facebook.com/rotpMY/posts/lazarus-kaimbi-pdrm-fc-transfer-confirmselepas-mengumumkan-bruno-suzuki-sebagai-/2890053507988440/

External links
 Profile at Bangkok Glass Official Website

1988 births
Living people
Footballers from Windhoek
Namibia international footballers
2008 Africa Cup of Nations players
Jomo Cosmos F.C. players
Association football forwards
Namibian expatriate sportspeople in South Africa
Namibian expatriate footballers
Expatriate soccer players in South Africa
Ramblers F.C. players
Expatriate footballers in Thailand
Lazarus Kaimbi
Lazarus Kaimbi
Lazarus Kaimbi
Lazarus Kaimbi
Namibian expatriate sportspeople in Thailand
Namibian men's footballers